Oesch's die Dritten is a Yodel Volksmusik family group from the Bernese Oberland, Switzerland. It consists of its lead vocalist and yodeler Melanie Oesch (born 14 December 1987), her mother Annemarie (born 8 February 1963), her father Hansueli (born 14 July 1958), her two brothers Mike (born 14 January 1989) and Kevin (born 23 October 1990), and Urs Meier (born 14 November 1980).

The words die Dritten refer to the third generation, after grandfather Hans and parents Hansueli and Annemarie.

Group members 

 Melanie Oesch – lead vocalist and yodeler
 Annemarie Oesch – singer
 Hansueli Oesch – Schwyzerörgeli
 Mike Oesch – electric bass guitar
 Kevin Oesch – acoustic guitar
 Urs Meier – accordion

Discography

Albums

Live albums

EPs

Singles

References

External links 
 Official website
 
 Video playlist on YouTube (29 songs)

Swiss folk music groups
Yodelers
Schlager groups